Arzin (also Romanized as Arzīn) is a village in Targavar Rural District, Silvaneh District, Urmia County, West Azerbaijan Province, Iran. At the 2006 census, its population was 72, in 10 families.

References 

Populated places in Urmia County